, officially , is a district of Chiyoda, Tokyo, Japan. As of April 1, 2007, its population is 35. Its postal code is 101-0053.

This district is located on the northern part of Chiyoda Ward. It borders Kanda-Ogawamachi on the north, Kanda-Tsukasamachi on the east, Uchi-Kanda on the south, and Kanda-Nishikichō on the west.

Education
 operates public elementary and junior high schools. Chiyoda Elementary School (千代田小学校) is the zoned elementary school for Mitoshirochō. There is a freedom of choice system for junior high schools in Chiyoda Ward, and so there are no specific junior high school zones.

References

Districts of Chiyoda, Tokyo